Örnek is a national Crimean Tatar ornament and one of the oldest cultural achievements of the Crimean Tatars. In 2021, Örnek and its knowledge was inscribed in the UNESCO Intangible Cultural Heritage Lists.

Description
The Örnek contains small elements combined into a composition, mainly of a plant and geometric nature, symmetrically and asymmetrically arranged. The main symbolism is the image of flowers and trees in shades of pink, green, yellow and blue. The ornament is used as an element of the decor of national clothes, shoes, headdresses, as well as in jewelry, on ceramic and metal dishes, wooden products, household appliances, in furniture decoration, carpets.

Recognition
In February 2018, the Örnek was inscribed in the National List of Intangible Cultural Heritage of Ukraine.

The ornament, as an element of the intangible cultural heritage (Intangible Cultural Heritage) of Ukraine, was included in the preliminary list of UNESCO for its possible inclusion in the representative list of the intangible cultural heritage of mankind. On 16 December 2021, the Örnek was officially included in the UNESCO cultural heritage. The nomination of "Ornek - Crimean Tatar ornament" was a long-term initiative of the Crimean Tatar public organization "Alem".

References

Ornaments
Crimean Tatar culture
Intangible Cultural Heritage of Humanity
Ukrainian art